Jon Pattis (died January 12, 1996) was an American telecommunications engineer who was imprisoned in Iran from 1986 to 1991.

Early life and education
Pattis was a native of Aiken, South Carolina. He graduated from the University of South Carolina.

Career
Following college, Pattis worked for Bendix Radio Division in Baltimore, Maryland. He subsequently worked for Page Communications Engineers, TAI Inc., Oil Services Co. of Iran, and E Systems. He had overseas work assignments in such locales as Beirut, South America, and Cuba.

Imprisonment in Iran
In 1986, Pattis was working for the American company Cosmos Engineering at Iran's main satellite ground station at Asadabad, some 200 miles southwest of Tehran. Iranian authorities arrested him on June 16, 1986, shortly after an Iraqi raid shut down the telecommunications facility and severed Iran's telephone and telex links with the world for about two weeks. Pattis was coerced into confessing he had been spying for the Central Intelligence Agency (CIA) in a televised news conference. He was released in 1991 after serving half of his 10-year sentence. Pattis arrived back to his hometown of Aiken, South Carolina on October 7, 1991.

Life after imprisonment
From 1992, Pattis worked for GTE Corporation. At the age of 58, Pattis died of congestive heart failure on January 12, 1996, in Arlington, Virginia.

See also
 List of foreign nationals detained in Iran

References

1996 deaths
American telecommunications engineers
American people imprisoned in Iran
People from Aiken, South Carolina
Bendix Corporation people